Drexler is a German surname.  It may refer to:

People 
 Anton Drexler, German politician and early mentor of Adolf Hitler
 Clyde Drexler, American basketball player
 Dominick Drexler, German footballer
 Doug Drexler, American illustrator and graphic designer
 Hans Drexler, Swiss swimmer
 Henry Clay Drexler, American Medal of Honor recipient
 Henry Drexler (1927–1991), American microbiologist and phage T1 pioneering researcher, namesake of the virus family Drexlerviridae 
 Hilde Drexler, Austrian judoka
 John Michael Drexler (1905-1970), American businessman and politician
 Jorge Drexler, Uruguayan singer
 K. Eric Drexler, American scientist
 Lynne Mapp Drexler, American painter
 Manfred Drexler (1951–2017), German football midfielder and sweeper
 Melissa Drexler, American criminal
 Millard Drexler, American CEO of J.Crew 
 Oskar Drexler, German soldier
 Rosalyn Drexler, American artist, novelist, and playwright
 Sherman Drexler (1925–2014), American figurative expressionist painter, mainly of female nudes
 Walter Drexler, German soldier

Ship 
 USS Drexler (DD-741), an U.S. Navy Allen M. Sumner-class destroyer, named in honour of Ensign Henry Clay Drexler
 2019 Drexler-Automotive Formula 3 Cup, the 38th Austria Formula 3 Cup season and the first Drexler-Automotive Formula 3 Cup season

See also 
 Drechsler
 Dressler
 Drexel (disambiguation)
 Draxler
 Turner

German-language surnames
Occupational surnames

it:Drexler